Cabaret Cartoons is a live light entertainment series broadcast by BBC Television 193639 and 1946. It was a spin-off from the series Cabaret. Its distinctive feature was that English artist Harry Rutherford (190385) drew cartoon sketches of the performers during the broadcast. Rutherford did not speak: the producer, Cecil Madden, decreed that his Mancunian accent was inappropriate to be heard on the BBC.

No episodes have survived.

Performers 
Numbers of appearances are given in parentheses.
 Beverley Sisters, English vocal trio (1) 
 Truda Binarová, Czechoslovak actress (5) 
 Petula Clark (born 1932), English singer (2) 
 Edward Cooper (18831956), English actor (1) 
 Evelyn Dall (19182010), American singer (2) 
 Robert Harbin (190878), British magician and actor (1) 
 Grace (190755) and Paul Hartman (190473), American dancers (1) 
 Nosmo King (and Hubert) (18861952), English comedian (2) 
 Harry Rutherford (190385), English artist (19) 
 Eric Woodburn (18941981), Scottish comedian (1)

See also 
 Cabaret
 Cabaret Cruise
 Comedy Cabaret
 Intimate Cabaret
 Eastern Cabaret
 Western Cabaret

Notes

References

External links 
 
  Includes some false positives

1930s British television series
1936 British television series debuts
1946 British television series endings
Lost BBC episodes
BBC Television shows
Black-and-white British television shows
British variety television shows